Storyliving by Disney is a business venture and brand of The Walt Disney Company announced on February 16, 2022, to collaboratively develop master-planned communities that utilize Disney Imagineering and are staffed by Disney cast members. It operates under the company's Disney Living Development, Inc. subsidiary. Cotino, in Rancho Mirage, California, is the first Storyliving by Disney community under development with other locations being explored.

Cotino

Cotino, in Southern California's Coachella Valley, in the city of Rancho Mirage, is the first Storyliving by Disney community under development. It is adjacent to, and on land once owned by, the Annenberg Sunnylands Estate. Developed in collaboration with DMB Development LLC of Scottsdale, Arizona, Cotino will be a  mixed-use development with several residential options, hotels, resort facilities, and a retail center, all surrounding a  grand oasis and lagoon.

The community's name, Cotino, was derived from Cotinus, the genus name of a plant commonly referred to as the Smoketree. It was chosen in recognition of Walt Disney, who maintained a home in the Smoke Tree Ranch in nearby Palm Springs. Smoke Tree Ranch was one of Disney's favorite locations to relax. So loved by Disney, the Ranch's stylized STR emblem was included on Walt's tie on the 1993 Walt Disney and Mickey Mouse statue, Partners.

Groundbreaking for the project was held on April 23, 2022. The first  tract map was tentatively approved by the Rancho Mirage Planning Commission on July 14, 2022, despite opposition by some Coachella Valley residents who cited the ongoing megadrought as a reason to revisit the environmental impact of the project before allowing the developer to proceed. Home sales are expected to begin in early 2023 with the first homes completed in early 2024.

Section 31
The Cotino development includes most of US land survey Section 31 in the city of Rancho Mirage. Investors had previously purchased the land from the Annenberg estate in 1977, and in 1993 The Eagle Specific Plan had been approved for development, but never started. After some ownership changes, and at least two bankruptcies brought on by the financial crisis of 2008, Section 31 did not become available again until 2016. In 2017 a  portion of the land, separated from the rest of Section 31 by Monterey Boulevard, was sold to the Tower Energy Group. The remainder of Section 31 was purchased in 2018 for $75 million by EC Rancho Mirage Holdings Limited Partnership, a Canadian firm organized in the state of Delaware. EC Rancho Mirage brought in DMB Development LLC to help design a new plan for the site, initially called the Section 31 Specific Plan or Section 31 Project. When Disney was brought in to apply their expertise and brand, the Section 31 Project became Cotino.

See also

Celebration, Florida
Golden Oak at Walt Disney World Resort
Coachella Valley
EPCOT (concept)

References

External links
Official brand website: Storyliving by Disney
Cotino, A Storyliving by Disney Community
DMB Development, LLC; Cotino

New Urbanism communities
Planned communities in the United States
The Walt Disney Company
Real estate companies of the United States
2022 establishments in California